Sweet Japonic is a roots rock band from Grand Rapids, Michigan.  Together they fuse blues, rock, folk, funk, and soul into eclectic rhythms that carry both an old flavor and new flair. Their 2006 second album Two O’clock Sirens earned a WYCE Jammie award for Best Rock Album, adding to the band’s previous Jammie for the 2005 release Through the Eyes of Lucie Blue.

Sweet Japonic has seen a boom in popularity since they were recently selected by Coca-Cola and Paste Magazine as one of 40 up-and-coming bands, and were featured on both Coke and Paste’s websites as part of their 'For the Love of Music' campaign. FreePlay Music Publishing (New York City, New York) signed the band to a publishing deal and several movies have requested to license their tracks in upcoming feature films.

Members
 Lucas Wilson - Lead Vocals, Guitar
 Matt Young - Backing Vocals, Lead Guitar
 Sam Parks - Co-Lead Guitar,
 Gabe Dutton - Backing Vocals, Bass Guitar
 Roy Wallace - Drums, Backing Vocals

Past members
 Ryan Braman – bass guitar
 Davy Tyson - keyboards, organ, backing vocals (still plays with the band from time to time)
 Ross Veldheer – drums
 Andy Weaver – lead guitar
 Karisa Wilson – backing vocals, violin

The band played their last show together on New Years 2010.
The band and Lucas Wilson mutually decided to part ways.  The remaining members are currently playing as the Sweet J Band and backing numerous other artists.

Discography

Albums

References

Musical groups established in 2003
Musical groups from Michigan
American folk rock groups
2003 establishments in Michigan